Dennis Carroll Moss (born January 13, 1954) is an American politician. He is a member of the South Carolina House of Representatives from the 29th District, serving since 2007. He is a member of the Republican party.

Moss is Chair of the House Invitations and Memorial Resolutions Committee.

References

Living people
1954 births
Republican Party members of the South Carolina House of Representatives
People from Union, South Carolina
21st-century American politicians